Al Arabi Basketball Team is a Qatari professional basketball team based in Doha, Qatar. Al Arabi is one of the most successful basketball clubs in Qatar, with many domestic and international titles to its name. It is part of the Al Arabi Sports Club multisport club.

Honours

Domestic
Qatari Championship

 Winners (9): 1974–75, 1975–76, 1981–82, 1982–83, 1983–84, 1984–85, 1985–86, 1991–92, 1993–94, 2017/2018

Qatari Cup 
 Winners (2): 2007, 2012

Emir of Qatar Cup
Winners (1): 1982, 2018

International
GCC Clubs Championship

 Winners (1): 2008

References

Basketball teams in Doha